Demon Hero and Other Extraordinary Phantasmagoric Anomalies & Fables is the fifth studio album by The Clay People, released on September 28, 2018 by Magnetic Eye Records. It contains reworked re-recordings of the previously released songs "Palegod" from The Iron Icon and "Strange Day" from Stone-Ten Stitches.

Reception
ReGen gave the album a positive review, calling it a "celebration of the band's past" and "a solidified merging of alt. metal and coldwave along with more refined songwriting that is sure to please longtime fans as well as attract some new crowds."

Track listing

Personnel
Adapted from the Demon Hero and Other Extraordinary Phantasmagoric Anomalies & Fables liner notes.

Clay People
 Dan Dinsmore – drums, producer, executive-producer
 Brian McGarvey – vocals, production
 Daniel Neet – lead vocals, synthesizer, production

Production and design
 Alan Douches – mastering
 Scoops Dardaris – associate producer
 Neil Kernon – mixing

Release history

References

External links 
 Demon Hero and Other Extraordinary Phantasmagoric Anomalies & Fables at Bandcamp
 Demon Hero and Other Extraordinary Phantasmagoric Anomalies & Fables at Discogs (list of releases)

2018 albums
The Clay People albums